Zoie Tam Hoi-ki (born 10 October 1981) is a Hong Kong actress, singer and television presenter currently under Television Broadcasts Limited (TVB) management. She debuted as a singer in Japan and previously acted in Japanese and Hong Kong television station Asia Television (ATV) dramas. She is able to converse in Cantonese, Mandarin, English and Japanese.

Biography
Zoie Tam was born on 10 October 1981 in Hong Kong. She is the third child of a family of four daughters. Her older sister, Nicole Tam (譚凱欣), is a former model and artiste who is now married to Jason Chu (朱永棠), best remembered for his role in the original Young and Dangerous.

Tam attended Queen Maud Secondary School and is a graduate of Hong Kong's Wellington College located in Kowloon Bay. After graduation she went abroad to study in Japan, where she was discovered by a talent scout and popular idol Tetsuya Komuro from talent agency Rojam Entertainment.

In 2020, Tam announced her marriage with her out-of-industry friend, Enrico Chong (莊日宇). In October, she gave birth to the couple’s daughter Gabri via C-section.

Tam became good friends with Grace Chan, Katy Kung and Jessie Sum when filming the drama The Forgotten Valley.

Career

Music
Zoie Tam signed with Rojam and was trained for four month before debuting with her first album in 2000 Full Of Love (全力愛). The album was released in Cantopop but arranged according to j-pop style. The album was also released in Taiwan by Rock Records. Komuro thought Tam looked Japanese and would be interesting if the public thought a Japanese singer who can sing Cantonese. That same year she released a J-pop singles album of the song Garapagosu-no-JULIET (ガラパゴスのJULIET) remixed in Japanese. Not having much success in Japan, Tam moved to Taiwan to try to enter the Taiwanese music industry. But after spending a year doing mostly modeling advertisement work she decided to return to Hong Kong to break into the industry.

Acting
Tam made her acting debut in 2002 with a minor role in a low budget film Troublesome Night 13. She later branched out acting in Japanese, Korean and Hong Kong ATV dramas's. She also served briefly as a variety show presenter for ATV before joining cable channel Cable TV in 2007. While at Cable TV Tam co-hosted The Unbelievable and several travel series.

In 2013, Tam signed with Hong Kong's largest television station, Television Broadcasts Limited (TVB). She started participating in variety shows such as All Things Girl (姊妹淘), which focused on fashion, make-up, hair, skincare and health. Tam first acting role with TVB was a supporting role in the 2014 mini series Shades of Life, which depicted Hong Kong society. She gained recognition with her role as "Crystal Lee" in the 2016 drama Over Run Over, earning her first Best Supporting Actress nomination at the 2016 TVB Anniversary Awards. Tam received attention when her sexily dressed character appeared to arouse her co-star. Her performance in the 2017 drama My Unfair Lady won her the Favourite TVB Most Improved Female Artiste award at the 2017 TVB Star Awards Malaysia.

Tam garnered praise for her portrayal of the Japanese spy "Tin Kiu" in the 2018 drama The Learning Curve of a Warlord, starring along with veteran actor Dicky Cheung. In 2020, she had notable performance in the supernatural drama The Exorcist’s 2nd Meter'' as the sea demon "Thalassa", earning her first nomination for the Most Popular Female Character at the 2020 TVB Anniversary Awards.

Filmography

Television dramas

Television Broadcasts Limited (TVB)

Shaw Brothers

Asia Television (ATV)

Foreign dramas

Films

Presenter

TVB

i-CABLE

ATV

Discography

Studio Album

References

External links

Official TVB profile

1981 births
Living people
Hong Kong television actresses
21st-century Hong Kong women singers
21st-century Hong Kong actresses